Narpa Bhumi Rural Municipality (Narpa Bhumi Gaupalika) (Nepali: नार्पा भुमी गाउँपालिका) is a Gaunpalika in Manang District in Gandaki Province of Nepal. On 12 March 2017, the government of Nepal implemented a new local administrative structure, in which VDCs have been replaced with municipal and Village Councils. Narpa Bhumi  is one of these 753 local units. Its population is 538.

References 

Manang District, Nepal
Gandaki Province
Rural municipalities of Nepal established in 2017
Rural municipalities in Manang District